Daphnis hayesi is a moth of the  family Sphingidae.

Distribution 
It is known from Sulawesi in Indonesia.

References

Daphnis (moth)
Moths described in 1988